Christine Maria Kaufmann (11 January 1945 – 28 March 2017) was a German-Austrian actress, author, and businesswoman. The daughter of a German father and a French mother, she won the Golden Globe Award for New Star of the Year – Actress for Town Without Pity in 1961, the first German to be so honoured.

Life and career
Kaufmann was born in Lengdorf, Styria, Austria. Her mother, Geneviève Kaufmann (née Gavaert), was a French make-up artist; her father, Johannes Kaufmann, was a German Luftwaffe officer and engineer.

Growing up in Munich, Bavaria, Kaufmann became a ballerina at the Munich Opera. She began her film career at the age of seven in The White Horse Inn (1952) and appeared as a lead actress in Der Schweigende Engel the same year, but gained big attention with Rose-Girl Resli in 1954. She achieved international recognition when she starred with Steve Reeves in The Last Days of Pompeii (1959) and with Kirk Douglas in Town Without Pity (1961). The following year she appeared in Escape from East Berlin and with future husband Tony Curtis in Taras Bulba.

Kaufmann resumed her career, which she had interrupted during her marriage with Curtis, notably with supporting roles in the Rainer Werner Fassbinder films Lili Marleen and Lola. She often worked with German director Helmut Dietl, for example in the satirical television series Monaco Franze. In 1987, she played a glamorous tattoo artist in the cult classic Bagdad Cafe, an offbeat comedy set in a desolate truck stop café and motel in the Mojave Desert. Her last role was Aunt Polly in the American film Tom Sawyer & Huckleberry Finn (2014), co-starring Jake T. Austin and Val Kilmer.

In her later years, Kaufmann was also a successful businesswoman; she promoted her own line of cosmetics products that sold well in Germany.  From her 40s until her death, the media often called Kaufmann the "most beautiful grandmother in Germany". She wrote several books about beauty and health, as well as two autobiographies.

Personal life 
At age 18 in 1963, Kaufmann married her Taras Bulba co-star Tony Curtis. They had two daughters, Alexandra Theodora Dido Curtis (born 19 July 1964) and Allegra Curtis (born 11 July 1966). The couple divorced in 1968.  Kaufmann married three more times: to television director Achim Lenz (1974–76), musician and actor Reno Eckstein (1979–1982) and illustrator Klaus Zey (1997–2011). On German television, Kaufmann admitted to having an affair with Warren Beatty.

Kaufmann enjoyed traveling. She moved from one place to another frequently. She spoke three languages: German, English, and French.

Kaufmann died of leukemia in Munich at age 72 on 28 March 2017, only a few days after she had been diagnosed with the disease.

Filmography

Film

Television

References

External links

 
 
 

1945 births
2017 deaths
Cosmetics businesspeople
Deaths from cancer in Germany
Deaths from leukemia
German ballerinas
German businesspeople
German child actresses
German film actresses
German people of French descent
German television actresses
20th-century German actresses
21st-century German actresses
New Star of the Year (Actress) Golden Globe winners
People from Styria
Actresses from Munich
Businesspeople from Munich